Murshed is both a surname and a given name. Notable people with the name include:

Hasina Murshed, Bengali politician and educationist
Niaz Murshed (born 1966), Bangladeshi chess grandmaster
Mansoob Murshed, professor
Murshed Al-Arashani, Minister of Justice in Yemen